Pé na Jaca is a Brazilian telenovela produced and aired by TV Globo from 20 November 2006 to 15 June 2007.

It stars Murilo Benício, Juliana Paes, Fernanda Lima, Marcos Pasquim, Betty Lago, Fúlvio Stefanini, Alexandre Schumacher, Carla Marins, Ricardo Tozzi, Fernanda de Freitas, Daniele Suzuki, Rodrigo Lombardi, Bruno Garcia, Flávia Alessandra and Deborah Secco in the leading roles.

Plot 
In 1984 five children live on a farm near Piracicaba. Arthur spends the holidays at his uncle's farm. Elizabeth is the daughter of a seamstress. Guinevere is the daughter of a maid. Mary is the daughter of a wealthy farmer Lancelotti is the son of a farmer. The farm is on the edge of a river in São Paulo, in God Free Me village near Piracicaba.

The five play without realizing the social differences that separate them and feel confident that their friendship will last forever. The holidays end and with the exception of Lancelotti and Mary, never meet again.

Twenty-five years pass until fate puts Arthur, Elizabeth, Guinevere, and Maria Lancelotti together again. They meet in the city God of Me Free.

Arthur and Guinevere fall in love. Guinevere was previously married to Kermit (son of millionaire Botelho Bulhões) and had an affair with Lance (Lancelotti or Tico, the more intimate nickname), who is in love with Maria. Maria Bo had a husband Jean Luc, who supported France. He was a bankrupt earl. Maria also had a lover, Thierry. Arthur is married to Vanessa a mercenary who betrayed him with Juan. This helped Elizabeth (who becomes the major villain) in their frames, and encourages her to move to the side of evil. She had a crush on Deodato, who was the mysterious accomplice to Morgana. She had an affair with Merlin's friend, forming a love triangle.

Elizabeth will do anything to harm her former friends, moved only by envy and ambition, even to the extreme by money and power, while other friends join together and try to show her that love and charity are virtues needed to live happy truly.

Cast
 Murilo Benício as Arthur Fortuna
 Deborah Secco as Elizabeth "Beth" Aparecida Barra
 Juliana Paes as Guinevere "Gui" Ataliba dos Santos Fortuna
 Marcos Pasquim as Antônio Carlos Lancelotti
 Fernanda Lima as Maria Bô (Maria Botelho "Maria Bô" Bulhões
 Flávia Alessandra as Vanessa Fortuna
 Bruno Garcia as Juan Arrabal
 Fúlvio Stefanini as Último Botelho Bulhões
 Betty Lago as Maria Carolina Botelho Bulhões "Morgana"
 Carla Marins as Dorinha Isadora "Dorinha" Cabedelo Haddad
 Alexandre Schumacher as Carlos "Caco" Eduardo Botelho Bulhões
 Ricardo Tozzi as Cândido Fortuna Botelho Bulhões
 Fernanda de Freitas as Maria Leila "Lilinha" Barra Botelho Bulhões de Canabrava
 Rodrigo Lombardi as Tadeu Lancelotti
 Sílvia Pfeifer as Maria Clara Botelho Bulhões Noscheze
 Daniele Suzuki as Rosa Tanaka
 Humberto Martins as Merlin Botelho Bulhões / Vasco
 Betty Faria as Laura Barra
 Daniele Valente as Maria Celina
 Carlos Bonow as Edmilson "Ed"
 Elias Gleizer as Giácomo Lancelotti
 Sérgio Hondjakoff as Nuno Botelho Noscheze
 Oscar Magrini as Delegado Palhares
 Alexandre Barros as Átila Noscheze
 Cláudia Ventura as Maria Eduarda "Duda"
 Cristina Sano as Mitiko Tanaka
 Dan Nakagawa as Mário Tanaka
 Dudu Azevedo as Petrônio "Pipoca" Palhares
 Emanuelle Araújo as Clotilda Rodrigues Alves
 Érika Evantini as Mimosa "Mimi" Queirós
 Gero Pestalozzi as Deodato
 Guilherme Piva as Agronildo "Nirdo" Ferreira Sales
 Lucy Ramos as Nina Botelho Noscheze "Guguta"
 Marcelo Torreão as Plácido Haddad
 Maria Estela Rivera as Irina Botelho Bulhões
 Rodrigo Hilbert as Flávio Barra "Barrão"
 Samantha Schmütz as Célia
 Igor Rudolf as Maurício Fortuna
 João Vieira as Zidane Ataliba Botelho Bulhões
 Larissa Biondo as Débora Lancelotti Cabedelo
 Miguel Rômulo as Marcos "Marquinhos" Lancelotti Cabedelo
 Rafael Miguel as Percival Fortuna
 Sofia Terra as Josephine "Jô" Botelho Bulhões
 Chico Anysio as Ezequiel de Jesus "Cigano"
 Leonardo Villar as José Fortuna "Tio José"
 Paulo Goulart as Roberto Vilela
 Walmor Chagas as Canabrava
 Neuza Amaral as Gema
 Arlete Salles as Gioconda
 Lolita Rodrigues as Carmem Cabedelo
 Maria Zilda Bethlem as Alma

External links
 

2006 Brazilian television series debuts
2007 Brazilian television series endings
2006 telenovelas
Brazilian telenovelas
TV Globo telenovelas
Television series based on Arthurian legend
Portuguese-language telenovelas